Marlen Haushofer (born Marie Helene Frauendorfer; 11 April 1920 – 21 March 1970) was an Austrian author, most famous for her novel The Wall (1963).

Biography
Marie Helene Frauendorfer was born in Frauenstein in Upper Austria. She attended Catholic boarding school in Linz, and went on to study German literature in Vienna and in Graz. After her school years she settled in Steyr.

In 1941, she married Manfred Haushofer, a dentist, and had two sons, Christian and Manfred. They divorced in 1950, only to remarry each other in 1958.

Work
Earning literary awards as early as 1953, Haushofer went on to publish her first novel, A Handful of Life in 1955. In 1956, she won the Theodor Körner Prize for early contributions and projects involving art and culture. In 1958, her novella We Murder Stella was published.

The Wall, considered her finest achievement, was completed in 1963. The novel was written out four times in longhand between 1960 and 1963. In a letter written to a friend in 1961, Marlen describes the difficulty with its composition:
I am writing on my novel and everything is very cumbersome because I never have much time, and mainly because I can not embarrass myself. I must continuously inquire whether what I say about animals and plants is actually correct. One can not be precise enough. I would be very happy, indeed, if I were able to write the novel only half as well as I am imagining it in my mind.

Haushofer commented a year later in a letter to the same friend:
I am extremely industrious. My novel is completed in its first draft. I have already completed one hundred pages of the rewrite. Altogether there will be 360 pages. Writing strains me a great deal and I suffer from headaches. But I hope that I will be finished by the beginning of May (I must allow at least four weeks for the typing)... And the household must keep on running also. All that is very difficult for me because I can only concentrate on one thing and forcing me to be versatile makes me extremely nervous. I have the feeling as if I were writing into the air.

Her autobiographical account of a childhood, Nowhere Ending Sky, was published in 1966. Her overall addition to Austrian literature, as well as her last short-story collection, Terrible Faithfulness, earned her a Grand Austrian State Prize for literature in 1968. Her last novel, The Loft, was published in 1969.

Death and legacy

In 1970, she died of bone cancer at a clinic in Vienna. Her writing has influenced authors like Nobel Prize winner Elfriede Jelinek, who dedicated one of her Princess Plays to Haushofer. She was cremated at Feuerhalle Simmering, after which her ashes were buried in Steyr City Cemetery.

Bibliography
Eine Handvoll Leben (1955). A Handful of Life
Die Tapetentür (1957). The Jib Door, trans. by Jerome Carlton Samuelson (1998)
Wir töten Stella (1958, novella). We Murder Stella
Die Wand (1963). The Wall, trans. by Shaun Whiteside (1990)
Himmel, der nirgendwo endet (1966). Nowhere Ending Sky, trans. by Amanda Prantera (2013)
Schreckliche Treue (1968, short stories). Terrible Faithfulness
Die Mansarde (1969). The Loft, trans. by Amanda Prantera (2011)

References

Further reading

External links
Marlen Haushofer im WWW 
Marlen Haushofer – Ihre Wurzeln in Molln 
Marlen Haushofer author page by Euro Journal 

1920 births
1970 deaths
20th-century women writers
Austrian women writers
Austrian women novelists
20th-century Austrian novelists
Women science fiction and fantasy writers